This is a list of museums in Vatican City.

Museums in Vatican City 

 Museo del Tesoro di San Pietro
 Vatican Museums
 Gregoriano Etrusco Museum
 Gregoriano Profano Museum
 Modern Religious Art Museum
 Pio-Clementino Museum
 Pio Cristiano Museum
 The Gallery of Maps
 Vatican Historical Museum
 Museo missionario etnologico

See also 
 List of museums
 List of archives in Vatican City
 List of libraries in Vatican City
 Culture of Vatican City

External links 

 
Vatican City
Museums
Vatican City

Museums